Dennis Joseph O'Neil (May 3, 1939 – June 11, 2020) was an American comic book writer and editor, principally for Marvel Comics and DC Comics from the 1960s through the 1990s, and Group Editor for the Batman family of titles until his retirement.

His best-known works include Green Lantern/Green Arrow and Batman with Neal Adams. For Batman, the team are credited with returning the Batman character to his dark gothic roots, in contrast to the campy Batman television series of the 1960s. However, comics historian Les Daniels considers O'Neil's "vengeful obsessive-compulsive" Batman to be an original interpretation that has influenced all subsequent portrayals of the character. It was during this run that O'Neil co-created the Batman villains Ra's al Ghul and Talia al Ghul. During their Green Lantern/Green Arrow run, O'Neil and Adams introduced a mature, realistic tone through stories such as "Snowbirds Don't Fly", in which Green Arrow's young ward Roy "Speedy" Harper is revealed to have become addicted to drugs. They also created and introduced the Green Lantern character John Stewart in 1971.

As an editor, he is principally known for editing the various Batman titles beginning in 1986 after returning to DC. In 1989, O'Neil launched the Batman: Legends of the Dark Knight series, and was the writer for the "Shaman" and "Venom" stories. O'Neil led the Batman creative teams for the Batman: Knightfall (1993–1994) story arc. O'Neil co-created the antihero Azrael (Jean-Paul Valley) in 1992, who temporarily became the new Batman during Knightfall. After the storyline's conclusion, O'Neil was the writer for an Azrael monthly series that had 100 issues.

His other notable work includes creating Richard Dragon with Jim Berry, and runs on The Shadow with Michael Kaluta and The Question with Denys Cowan. While working for Marvel, O'Neil scripted issues for The Amazing Spider-Man, Iron Man, and Daredevil during the 1980s. In the late 1990s, O'Neil taught a comics writing course at Manhattan's School of Visual Arts. He also sat on the board of directors of the charity The Hero Initiative and served on its Disbursement Committee.

Early life
O'Neil was born into an Irish Catholic household in St. Louis, Missouri on May 3, 1939. On Sunday afternoons he would accompany his father or his grandfather to the store for some light groceries and an occasional comic book. O'Neil graduated from Saint Louis University around the turn of the 1960s with a degree centered on English literature, creative writing, and philosophy. From there he joined the U.S. Navy just in time to participate in the blockade of Cuba during the Cuban Missile Crisis.

Career

Writing
After leaving the Navy, O'Neil moved on to a job with a newspaper in Cape Girardeau, Missouri. O'Neil wrote bi-weekly columns for the youth page, and during the slow summer months he filled the space with a series on the revival of the comics industry. This attracted the attention of Roy Thomas, who would eventually himself become one of the great names in the history of the medium.

Marvel Comics
When Roy Thomas left DC Comics to work for Stan Lee at Marvel Comics, he suggested that O'Neil take the Marvel writer's test, which involved adding dialogue to a wordless four-page excerpt of a Fantastic Four comic. O'Neil's entry resulted in Lee offering O'Neil a job. O'Neil had never considered writing for comics, and later said he'd done the test "kind of as a joke. I had a couple of hours on a Tuesday afternoon, so instead of doing crossword puzzles, I did the writer's test."

When Marvel's expansion made it impossible for Lee to continue writing the company's entire line of books, Lee passed as much on to Roy Thomas as he could, but still needed writers, so O'Neil took the reins for a short-term run of Doctor Strange stories in Strange Tales, penning six issues. He also wrote dialog for such titles as Rawhide Kid and Millie the Model, as well as scripting the final 13 pages of Daredevil #18 over a plot by Lee, when Lee went on vacation.

O'Neil and artist Neal Adams revived the Professor X character in X-Men #65 in one of the creative team's earliest collaborations.

Charlton Comics
The available jobs writing for Marvel petered out fairly quickly, and O'Neil took a job with Charlton Comics under the pseudonym of Sergius O'Shaugnessy. There he received regular work for a year and a half from Charlton's editor Dick Giordano.

DC Comics
In 1968, Dick Giordano was offered an editorial position at DC Comics and took a number of Charlton freelancers with him, including O'Neil.

O'Neil's first assignments involved two strategies for bolstering DC's sales. One approach centered on the creation of new characters, and O'Neil scripted several issues of Beware the Creeper, a series starring a new hero, the Creeper, created by artist Steve Ditko. From there, DC moved O'Neil to Wonder Woman and Justice League of America. With artist Mike Sekowsky, he took away Wonder Woman's powers, exiled her from the Amazon community, and set her off, uncostumed, into international intrigues with her blind mentor, I Ching. These changes did not sit well with Wonder Woman's older fans, particularly feminists, and O'Neil later acknowledged that de-powering DC's most well-known superheroine had unintentionally alienated readers. In Justice League, he had more success, introducing into that title the first socially and politically themed stories, setting the stage for later work on Green Lantern/Green Arrow. He and artist Dick Dillin made several changes to the membership of the JLA by removing founding members the Martian Manhunter and Wonder Woman.

Following the lead set by Bob Haney and Neal Adams in a Brave and the Bold story that visually redefined Green Arrow into the version that appeared in comics between 1969 and 1986, O'Neil stripped him of his wealth and playboy status, making him an urban hero. This redefinition would culminate in the character that appeared in Green Lantern/Green Arrow (with many stories also drawn by Adams), a socially conscious, left-wing creation that effectively took over Green Lantern's book to use him as a foil and straw man in sounding out the political concepts that would define that work. It was during this period that the most famous Green Arrow story appeared, in Green Lantern #85–86 ("Snowbirds Don't Fly"), when it was revealed that Green Arrow's ward Speedy was addicted to heroin. As a result of his work on Green Lantern and Green Arrow, O'Neil recounted, "I went from total obscurity to seeing my name featured in The New York Times and being invited to do talk shows. It's by no means an unmixed blessing. That messed up my head pretty thoroughly for a couple of years. ... Deteriorating marriage, bad habits, deteriorating relationships with human beings – with anything that wasn't a typewriter, in fact. It was a bad few years there." O'Neil and Adams also created the Green Lantern character John Stewart, who debuted in Green Lantern vol. 2 #87 (December 1971/January 1972).

O'Neil's 1970s run on the Batman titles, under the direction of editor Julius Schwartz, is perhaps his best-known endeavor, getting back to the character's darker roots after a period dominated by the campiness of the 1960s TV series. Comics historian Les Daniels observed that "O'Neil's interpretation of Batman as a vengeful obsessive-compulsive, which he modestly describes as a return to the roots, was actually an act of creative imagination that has influenced every subsequent version of the Dark Knight." O'Neil and Adams' creation Ra's al Ghul was introduced in the story "Daughter of the Demon" in Batman #232 (June 1971). O'Neil and artist Bob Brown also created Talia al Ghul. During this period, O'Neil frequently teamed up with his regular collaborator Adams (with Giordano often assisting on inks) on a number of memorable issues of both Batman and Detective Comics. The creative team would revive Two-Face in "Half an Evil" in Batman #234 (Aug. 1971) and revitalize the Joker in "The Joker's Five-Way Revenge!" in Batman #251 (Sept. 1973), a landmark story bringing the character back to his roots as a homicidal maniac who murders people on a whim and delights in his mayhem. O'Neil and Giordano created the Batman supporting character Leslie Thompkins in the story "There Is No Hope in Crime Alley" in Detective Comics #457 (March 1976). O'Neil and artist Don Newton killed the original version of Batwoman in Detective Comics #485 (Aug.–Sept. 1979). He wrote a short Christmas story, "Wanted: Santa Claus – Dead or Alive", for DC Special Series #21 (Spring 1980) which featured Frank Miller's first art on a Batman story.

When Julius Schwartz became the editor of Superman with issue #233 (Jan. 1971), he had O'Neil and artist Curt Swan streamline the Superman mythos, starting with the elimination of kryptonite. In 1973, O'Neil wrote revivals of two characters for which DC had recently acquired the publishing rights. A new series featuring the original Captain Marvel was launched with a February cover date and featured art by the character's original artist C. C. Beck. Later that same year, O'Neil and artist Michael Kaluta produced an "atmospheric interpretation" of the 1930s pulp hero in The Shadow series. In 1975, O'Neil wrote a comic book adaptation of the 1930s hero the Avenger. A revival of the Green Lantern title in 1976 was launched by O'Neil and artist Mike Grell.
Reuniting with Adams, O'Neil co-wrote the oversize Superman vs. Muhammad Ali (1978) which Adams has called a personal favorite of their collaborations.

Return to Marvel Comics
Upon O'Neil's return to Marvel Comics in 1980, he took on the scripting chores for The Amazing Spider-Man, which he did for a year. O'Neil wrote two issues of The Amazing Spider-Man Annual which were both drawn by Frank Miller. The 1980 Annual featured a team-up with Doctor Strange while the 1981 Annual showcased a meeting with the Punisher. He and artist John Romita Jr. introduced Madame Web in The Amazing Spider-Man #210 and Hydro-Man in #212. O'Neil was the regular scripter for Iron Man from 1982 to 1986 and Daredevil from 1983 to 1985. During his run on Iron Man, O'Neil introduced Obadiah Stane, later the Iron Monger, plunged Tony Stark back into alcoholism, turned Jim Rhodes into Iron Man, and created the Silver Centurion armor. O'Neil's run on Daredevil bridged the gap between Frank Miller's two runs on the title, usually with David Mazzucchelli as artist. He introduced Yuriko Oyama during his stint, who would later become the popular X-Men villain Lady Deathstrike. While working for Marvel, he helped write the original character concept for The Transformers, and is credited as the person who named Optimus Prime.

Return to DC Comics
After returning to DC Comics in 1986, he became the editor of the various Batman titles and served in that capacity until 2000. In February 1987, O'Neil began writing The Question ongoing series which was primarily drawn by Denys Cowan. Between the years of 1988 and 1990, O'Neil would return to Green Arrow writing the Annuals alongside the main title. Because he was also in charge of The Question, he would appear in all three Annuals that he wrote. The Batman: Legends of the Dark Knight series began in 1989 with the five-part "Shaman" storyline by O'Neil and artist Ed Hannigan. The series was the first new Batman title in almost fifty years, and the first issue sold almost a million copies. Armageddon 2001 was a 1991 crossover event storyline. It ran through a self-titled two-issue limited series and most of the Annuals DC published that year from May through October. Each participating annual explored potential possible futures for its main characters. The series was written by O'Neil and Archie Goodwin and drawn by Dan Jurgens. He and artist Joe Quesada created the character Azrael, who was introduced in the four-issue miniseries Batman: Sword of Azrael in 1992. That same year, O'Neil wrote the Batman: Birth of the Demon hardcover graphic novel. Another DC one-shot issue that O'Neil wrote in 1992 was Batman/Green Arrow: The Poison Tomorrow.

O'Neil led the Batman creative teams for the Batman: Knightfall (1993–1994) story arc, during which Azrael temporarily became the new Batman. In 1994, O'Neil wrote a novelization of Knightfall. In the opening of the novelization, O'Neil stated that part of the reason "Knightfall" was written was due to the recent popularity of more "ruthless" heroes such as the Terminator and James Bond in films, as editors were starting to wonder if readers would prefer a Batman who was willing to kill his opponents.

After the conclusion of Knightfall, O'Neil wrote the 100-issue Azrael comic series, chronicling Valley's battles against the Order of St. Dumas, between 1995 and 2003. O'Neil modeled the series on Arthurian legends, comparing Azrael's quest to discover the truth about himself to the Holy Grail. The series was originally intended to conclude with Azrael's death. However, after O'Neil suffered a heart attack in September 2002, editor Mike Carlin decided it wouldn't be appropriate to have a character O'Neil created be killed off. O'Neil instead left Azrael's fate vague, preferring to let readers decide what happened to him.

Other writing
O'Neil wrote several novels, comics, short stories, reviews and teleplays, including the novelizations of the films Batman Begins and The Dark Knight. Under the pseudonym Jim Dennis with writer Jim Berry, O'Neil scripted a series of novels about a kung fu character named Richard Dragon, and later adapted those novels to comic book form for DC.

O'Neil wrote a four-part column series for Marvel's 1978 The Hulk! magazine, under the pseudonym Jeff Mundo. "Jeff Mundo's Dark Corners" ran from issue #21 through issue #24 and covered various pop culture topics.

O'Neil wrote a column for ComicMix.

Editing
Joining Marvel's editorial staff in 1980, O'Neil edited Daredevil during Frank Miller's run as writer/artist. He fired writer Roger McKenzie so that Miller could both write and pencil Daredevil, a decision which then-Marvel editor-in-chief Jim Shooter says saved the series from cancellation. O'Neil encouraged Miller to develop a believable fighting style for Daredevil, and according to Miller, this directly led to his incorporating martial arts into Daredevil and later Ronin. In the early to mid-1980s, O'Neil edited such Marvel titles as Alpha Flight, Power Man and Iron Fist, G.I. Joe: A Real American Hero, and Moon Knight.

According to Bob Budiansky, O'Neil came up with the name for the Transformer Optimus Prime, leader of the Autobots.

In 1986, O'Neil moved over to DC as an editor, becoming group editor for the company's Batman titles. Speaking about his role in the death of character Jason Todd, O'Neil remarked:

It changed my mind about what I do for a living. Superman and Batman have been in continuous publication for over half a century, and it's never been true of any fictional construct before. These characters have a lot more weight than the hero of a popular sitcom that lasts maybe four years. They have become postindustrial folklore, and part of this job is to be the custodian of folk figures. Everybody on Earth knows Batman and Robin.

O'Neil said that he saw editing as a support role which should be invisible to the reader, and that if it were his choice his name would not appear in the credits when working as an editor, only when working as a writer.

Teaching
O'Neil spent several years in the late 1990s teaching a Writing for the Comics course at Manhattan's School of Visual Arts, sometimes sharing duties with fellow comic book writer John Ostrander.

Personal life
O'Neil was married to Marifran O'Neil, until her death. He was the father of writer/director/producer Lawrence "Larry" O'Neil, best known for the 1997 film Breast Men starring David Schwimmer.

He died of cardiopulmonary arrest on June 11, 2020, at the age of 81. The animated feature Batman: Soul of the Dragon was dedicated in his memory. Larry O'Neil wrote a wordless tribute to his father, called "Tap Tap Tap," which was illustrated by Jorge Fornés and published in the Green Arrow 80th Anniversary 100-Page Super Spectacular #1 (August 2021).

Awards
O'Neil's work won him a great deal of recognition in the comics industry, including the Shazam Awards for Best Continuing Feature Green Lantern/Green Arrow, Best Individual Story for "No Evil Shall Escape My Sight" in Green Lantern #76 (with Neal Adams), for Best Writer (Dramatic Division) in 1970 for Green Lantern, Batman, Superman, and other titles, and Best Individual Story for "Snowbirds Don't Fly" in Green Lantern #85 (with Neal Adams) in 1971.

O'Neil was given a Goethe Award in 1971 for "Favorite Pro Writer" and was a nominee for the same award in 1973. He shared a 1971 Goethe Award with artist Neal Adams for "Favorite Comic-Book Story" for "No Evil Shall Escape My Sight."

O'Neil received an Inkpot Award in 1981 and in 1985, DC Comics named O'Neil as one of the honorees in the company's 50th anniversary publication Fifty Who Made DC Great.

Appearances in media
In The Batman Adventures—the first DC Comics spinoff of Batman: The Animated Series—a caricature of O'Neil appears as The Perfesser, one of a screwball trio of incompetent supervillains that also includes the Mastermind (a caricature of Mike Carlin) and Mr. Nice (a caricature of Archie Goodwin). The Perfesser is depicted as a tall, pipe-smoking genius who often gets lost in his own thoughts.

Bibliography

Comic books

Charlton Comics
Abbott and Costello #1 (1968)
Thunderbolt #58–60 (1967)
Space Adventures #2 (1968)

DC Comics

1st Issue Special #13 (1976)
9-11: The World's Finest Comic Book Writers & Artists Tell Stories to Remember Volume Two (2002)
Adventure Comics #418–419, 449–451, 491–492 (1972–1982)
All New Collectors' Edition #C-56 (Superman vs. Muhammad Ali) (1978)
All-Star Western #6 (1971)
Armageddon 2001 #2 (1991)
Atom and Hawkman #42–45 (1969)
Azrael #1–100, 1,000,000, Annual #1–3, Azrael Plus Question #1 (1995–2003)
Azrael/Ash #1 (1997)
Bat Lash #2–7 (1968–1969)
Batman #224–225, 227, 232, 234–235, 237, 239–245, 247–248, 251, 253, 256–264, 266, 268, 286, 303, 320, 684 (1970–2009)
Batman & Robin: The Official Comic Adaptation #1 (1997)
Batman Black and White #3–4 (1996)
The Batman Chronicles #6, 16 (1996–1999)
Batman Family #18–19 (1978)
Batman Forever: The Official Comic Adaptation #1 (1995)
Batman Returns: The Official Comic Adaptation #1 (1992)
Batman/Green Arrow: The Poison Tomorrow #1 (1992)
Batman/Punisher: Lake of Fire #1 (1994)
Batman: Birth of the Demon HC (1993)
Batman: Death of Innocents #1 (1996)
Batman: Gordon of Gotham #1–4 (1998)
Batman: Legends of the Dark Knight #1–5, 16–20, 50, 59–61, 63, 100, 127–131 (1989–2000)
Batman: Sword of Azrael #1–4 (1992–1993)
Batman: The Official Comic Adaptation #1 (1989)
Beware the Creeper #1–6 (1968–1969)
The Brave and the Bold #93, 159 (1970–1980)
Challengers of the Unknown #68–74 (1969–1970)
DC Comics Presents #16, 19, 20, 23 (1979–1980)
 DC Comics Presents: The Flash #1 (2004)
DC Retroactive: Green Lantern – The '70s #1 (2011)
DC Retroactive: Wonder Woman – The '70s #1 (2011)
DC Special Series #1, 15–16, 21 (1977–1980)
DC Super Stars #17 (1977)
DC Universe Holiday Bash #1 (1997)
Detective Comics #395, 397, 399–401, 404–406, 410–411, 414, 418–419, 422, 425, 431, 451, 457, 460–462, 480–481, 483–491, 851, 866, 1000; Annual #1 (1989) (1969–2020)
Doc Savage #1–4 (limited series) (1987–1988)
Doc Savage #1–6 (ongoing series) (1988–1989)
The Flash #217–221, 223–224, 226–228, 230–231, 233–234, 237–238, 240–243, 245 (1972–1977)
From Beyond the Unknown #7–8 (1970)
Green Arrow Annual #1–3 (1988–1990)
Green Lantern #63–64, 68, 72, 76–87, 89, 90–100, 102–129 (1968–1972, 1976–1980)
DC Comics Presents #16, 19, 20, 23 (1979–1980)
Green Lantern 80th Anniversary 100-Page Super Spectacular #1
Isis #1 (1976)
JLA #91–93 (2004)
The Joker #1–3, 6 (1975–1976)
The Joker 80th Anniversary 100-Page Super Spectacular #1 (2020)
Justice, Inc. #1–4 (1975)
Justice League of America #66, 68–75, 77–83, 86, 115 (1968–1975)
Kamandi the Last Boy on Earth! #45–48 (1976–1977)
Legends of the DC Universe #7–9 (1998)
Nightwing #1–4 (limited series) (1995)
Phantom Stranger #8 (1970)
The Question #1–36, Annual #1–2, Quarterly #1–3, 5 (1987–1992)
Richard Dragon, Kung Fu Fighter #1–10, 13–18 (1975–1977)
The Shadow #1–8, 10, 12 (1973–1975)
Shazam! #1–7, 9, 14–15, 17, 25 (1973–1976)
Showcase #82–84 (1969)
Showcase 95 #3 (1995)
Spectre #9 (1969)
Strange Sports Stories #2, 4 (1973–1974)
Super Friends #20, 22, 24 (1979)
Superman #233–238, 240–242, 244, 247, 253, 254, 343, 351 (1971–1980)
Super-Team Family #2 (1976)
Sword of Sorcery #1–5 (1973)
Tarzan #217–218, 255–256 (1973–1976)
Time Warp #1, 3 (1979–1980)
Weird Worlds #4–10 (1973–1974)
Wonder Woman #178–181, 199–201 (1968–1972)
World's Finest Comics #198–199, 201–202, 204, 211–212, 214, 244, 256–264 (1970–1980)

Marvel Comics

The Amazing Spider-Man, #207–219, 221, 223, Annual #14–15 (1980–1981)
Chamber of Darkness #3–5 (1970)
Daredevil #18, 194–202, 204–207, 210–223, 225–226 (1966, 1983–1986)
Deadly Hands of Kung Fu #6 (1974)
Epic Illustrated #15–20 (1983)
Ghost Rider #7 (1967)
Heroes for Hope: Starring the X-Men #1 (1985)
The Hulk! #21–24 (Dominic Fortune back-up stories) (1980–1981)
Iron Man #158, 160–208 (1982–1986)
Kid Colt Outlaw #134–136, 138–139 (1967–1969)
Millie the Model #138–151, 153 (1966–1967)
Moon Knight #26 (1982)
Power Man and Iron Fist #85–89 (1982–1983)
Rawhide Kid #56, 58–59, 60, 62, 66 (1966–1968)
Savage Tales #1 (1971)
Savage Tales (vol. 2) #5 (1986)
Strange Tales #145–149, 167–168 (1966–1968)
Team America #2 (1982)
Two-Gun Kid #90, 92 (1967–1968)
X-Men #65 (1970)

Graphic novels
The Shadow "1941": Hitler's Astrologer – with Michael Kaluta and Russ Heath 1988
Batman: Birth of the Demon – 1992
Green Lantern/Green Arrow Vol. 1: Hard-Traveling Heroes – 1992
Batman: Shaman – 1993
Batman: Venom – 1993, 2012
Green Lantern/Green Arrow Vol. 2: More Hard-Traveling Heroes – 1993
Batman: Sword of Azrael – 1993
Batman: Bloodstorm – 1995
Batman: Death of Innocents: the Horror of Landmines – 1996
Batman in the Seventies – 2000
The Green Lantern/Green Arrow Collection – 2000
The Deadman Collection – 2001
Batman: The Ring, the Arrow, and the Bat – 2003
Green Lantern/Green Arrow Collection Volume 1 – 2004
Green Lantern/Green Arrow Collection Volume 2 – 2005
Green Lantern: Hero's Quest – 2005
Green Lantern/Green Arrow – 2012

Novellas
The Iconoclasts – Fantastic Stories, ed. Ted White, Ultimate Publishing, 1971
"Report on a Broken Bridge" – Ellery Queen's Mystery Magazine, December 1971
After They've Seen Paree – Generation, ed. David Gerrold, Dell, 1972
"The Elseones" – The Magazine of Fantasy & Science Fiction, February 1972
"Mister Cherubim" – Fantastic Stories, June 1972
"Noonday Devil" – Saving Worlds, eds. Roger Elwood and Virginia Kidd, Doubleday, 1973
"Devil Night" – Haunt of Horror, August 1973
"Annie Mae: A Love Story" – The Far Side of Time, ed. Roger Elwood, Dodd Mead, 1974
"There Are No Yesterdays!" – Unknown Worlds of Science Fiction March 1975
"Sister Mary Talks to the Girls Sodality" – Harpoon Magazine, January 1975
"The Killing of Mother Corn" – The Magazine of Fantasy & Science Fiction, February 1975
"Father Flotsky" – Apple Pie Magazine, May 1975
"Alias the Last Resort" – Best Detective Stories of the Year, ed. Hubin, 1975
"Adam and No Eve" (with Alfred Bester) – Unknown Worlds of Science Fiction, March 1975
"Wave By" – The Magazine of Fantasy & Science Fiction, September 1980
"Bicycle Superhero"- Superheroes, ed. John Varley, Ace Fantasy, 1995

Novels
The Bite of Monsters – Belmont, 1971
Dragon's Fists – Richard Dragon, Kung Fu Master with Jim Berry, 1974
Secret Origins of the Super DC Heroes – Crown Publishing Group, April 1976
The Super Comics – Scholastic Book Services 1981
Batman: Knightfall – 1994
Green Lantern: Hero's Quest – 2005
Batman Begins – 2005
DC Universe: Helltown – 2006
The Dark Knight – 2008

Non-fiction
The DC Comics Guide To Writing Comics, Watson-Guptill, May 2001 
Batman Unauthorized: Vigilantes, Jokers, and Heroes in Gotham City, SmartPop series, Benbella Books, March 2008 (editor)

Essays, reviews and interviews
The Lurker in the Family Room – The Haunt of Horror, June 1973
Review of Will Eisner's "A Contract With God" – Comics Journal #46, May 1979
Interview w/ Samuel R. Delany – Comics Journal #48, Summer 1979
The Super Comics – 1980
Article on Garry Trudeau/Doonesbury – Comics Journal #63, Summer 1981
Forum & Interview w/ Gil Kane – Comics Journal #64 July 1981
The Man of Steel and Me – Superman at 50, 1987
Martial Arts – Superman & Batman Magazine #1, with Marifran O'Neil, Summer 1993
Comics 101/Classes 1 & 2 – Write Now! #3, March 2003
Comics 101/Classes 3 & 4 – Write Now! #4, May 2003
Comics 101/Classes 5 & 6 – Write Now! #5, August 2003
"Introduction" to Superhero: The Secret Origin of a Genre by Peter Coogan (MonkeyBrain Books) (July 25, 2006)

Television
Logan’s Run (1978)
”Stargate”

 G.I Joe: A Real American Hero (1985)
”The Invaders”

Superboy (1989)
”Meet Mr. Mxyzptlk”
”Mr. and Mrs. Superboy”

Batman: The Animated Series (1993)
”The Demon’s Quest Part 1”
”The Demon’s Quest Part 2”

Animated film
Batman: Gotham Knight – audio commentary, 2008

References

External links

 
 Scifan.com Dennis O'Neil
 
 Dennis O'Neil's column on ComicMix
 Dennis O'Neil's Official Message Board
 Comic Geek Speak Podcast Interview (October 2005)
 "DC Profiles #15: Denny O'Neil" at the Grand Comics Database
 Dennis O'Neil at Mike's Amazing World of Comics
 Dennis O'Neil at the Unofficial Handbook of Marvel Comics Creators
 Dennis O'Neil year by year

1939 births
2020 deaths
American comics writers
American people of Irish descent
Comic book editors
Comics scholars
Inkpot Award winners
Marvel Comics writers
Military personnel from St. Louis
Silver Age comics creators
United States Navy sailors
Writers from St. Louis
Saint Louis University alumni
DC Comics people
20th-century American male writers
21st-century American male writers